John Buchan, 1st Baron Tweedsmuir  (26 August 1875 – 11 February 1940) was a Scottish novelist, historian, and Unionist politician who served as Governor General of Canada, the 15th since Canadian Confederation.

After a brief legal career, Buchan simultaneously began his writing career and his political and diplomatic careers, serving as a private secretary to the administrator of various colonies in southern Africa. He eventually wrote propaganda for the British war effort during the First World War. He was elected Member of Parliament for the Combined Scottish Universities in 1927, but he spent most of his time on his writing career, notably writing The Thirty-Nine Steps and other adventure fiction.

In 1935, King George V, on the advice of Prime Minister R. B. Bennett, appointed Buchan to replace the Earl of Bessborough as Governor General of Canada, for which purpose Buchan was raised to the peerage. He occupied the post until his death in 1940. Buchan was enthusiastic about literacy and the development of Canadian culture, and he received a state funeral in Canada before his ashes were returned to the United Kingdom.

Early life and education
Buchan was born at today's 18–20 York Place, a double villa now named after him, in Perth, Scotland. He was the first child of John Buchan – a Free Church of Scotland minister – and Helen Jane Buchan (née Masterson). He was brought up in Kirkcaldy, Fife, and spent many summer holidays with his maternal grandparents in Broughton in the Scottish Borders. There he developed a love for walking and for the local scenery and wildlife, both of which are often featured in his novels. The protagonist in several of his books is Sir Edward Leithen, whose name is borrowed from the Leithen Water, a tributary of the River Tweed.

Buchan attended Hutchesons' Boys' Grammar School in Glasgow, and was awarded a scholarship to the University of Glasgow at age 17, where he studied classics as a student of James Caddell and wrote poetry, and became a published author. He moved on to study Literae Humaniores (the Classics) at Brasenose College, Oxford, with a junior William Hulme scholarship in 1895, where his friends included Hilaire Belloc, Raymond Asquith, and Aubrey Herbert. Buchan won the Stanhope essay prize in 1897 and the Newdigate Prize for poetry the following year; he also was elected as the president of the Oxford Union and had six of his works published.

Buchan had his first portrait painted in 1900 by a young Sholto Johnstone Douglas at around the time of his graduation from Oxford.

Life as an author and politician

Buchan entered into a career in diplomacy and government after graduating from Oxford, becoming in 1901 the private secretary to Alfred Milner, who was then the High Commissioner for Southern Africa, Governor of Cape Colony, and colonial administrator of Transvaal and the Orange River Colony, putting Buchan in what came to be known as Milner's Kindergarten. He also gained an acquaintance with a country that would feature prominently in his writing, which he resumed upon his return to London, at the same time entering into a partnership in the Thomas Nelson & Son publishing company and becoming editor of The Spectator.

Buchan also read for and was called to the bar in the same year, though he did not practise as a lawyer, and on 15 July 1907 married Susan Charlotte Grosvenor—daughter of Norman Grosvenor and a cousin of the Duke of Westminster. Together, Buchan and his wife had four children, Alice, John, William, and Alastair, two of whom would spend most of their lives in Canada.

In 1910, Buchan wrote Prester John, the first of his adventure novels, set in South Africa, and the following year he suffered from duodenal ulcers, a condition that later afflicted one of his fictional characters. At the same time, Buchan ventured into the political arena, and was adopted as Unionist candidate in March 1911 for the Borders seat of Peebles and Selkirk; he supported free trade, women's suffrage, national insurance, and curtailing the powers of the House of Lords, while opposing the welfare reforms of the Liberal Party, and what he considered the class hatred fostered by Liberal politicians such as David Lloyd George.

With the outbreak of the First World War, Buchan went to write for the British War Propaganda Bureau and worked as a correspondent in France for The Times. He continued to write fiction, and in 1915 published his most famous work, The Thirty-Nine Steps, a spy-thriller set just prior to the First World War. The novel featured Buchan's oft-used hero, Richard Hannay, whose character was based on Edmund Ironside, a friend of Buchan from his days in South Africa. A sequel, Greenmantle, came the following year. In June 1916 Buchan was sent out to the Western Front to be attached to the British Army's General Headquarters Intelligence Section, to assist with drafting official communiques for the press. On arrival he received a field-commission as a second lieutenant in the Intelligence Corps.

Recognised for his abilities, Buchan was appointed as the Director of Information in 1917, under Lord Beaverbrook—which Buchan said was "the toughest job I ever took on"—and also assisted Charles Masterman in publishing a monthly magazine detailing the history of the war, the first edition appearing in February 1915 (and later published in 24 volumes as Nelson's History of the War). It was difficult for him, given his close connections to many of Britain's military leaders, to be critical of the British Army's conduct during the conflict. At Beaverbrook's request, Buchan met with journalist and neo-Jacobite Herbert Vivian and admitted to Vivian that he was a Jacobite sympathiser.

Following the close of the war, Buchan turned his attention to writing on historical subjects, along with his usual thrillers and novels. By the mid-1920s, he was living in Elsfield, Oxfordshire, and had become president of the Scottish Historical Society and a trustee of the National Library of Scotland, and he also maintained ties with various universities. Robert Graves, who lived in nearby Islip, mentioned his being recommended by Buchan for a lecturing position at the newly founded Cairo University. In a 1927 by-election, Buchan was elected as the Unionist Party Member of Parliament for the Combined Scottish Universities. Politically, he was of the Unionist-Nationalist tradition, believing in Scotland's promotion as a nation within the British Empire." The effects of the Great Depression in Scotland, and the subsequent high emigration from that country, also led him to reflect in the same speech: "We do not want to be like the Greeks, powerful and prosperous wherever we settle, but with a dead Greece behind us". He found himself profoundly affected by John Morley's Life of Gladstone, which Buchan read in the early months of the Second World War. He believed that Gladstone had taught people to combat materialism, complacency, and authoritarianism; Buchan later wrote to Herbert Fisher, Stair Gillon, and Gilbert Murray that he was "becoming a Gladstonian Liberal."

After the United Free Church of Scotland joined in 1929 with the Church of Scotland, Buchan remained an active elder of St Columba's Church in London, as well as of the Oxford Presbyterian church (now St Columba's United Reformed Church, Oxford). In 1933 and 1934, Buchan was further appointed as the King George V's Lord High Commissioner to the General Assembly of the Church of Scotland. Beginning in 1930, Buchan aligned himself with Zionism and the related Palestine All Party Parliamentary Group. (Despite this, Buchan was later described by Anthony Storr as being "overtly antisemitic", though he has been defended by others such as Roger Kimball, who stated that Buchan's antisemitism was merely representative of society at that time and that Buchan denounced Hitler's anti-semitic policies in 1934.) In recognition of his contributions to literature and education, on 1 January 1932, Buchan was granted the personal gift of the sovereign of induction into the Order of the Companions of Honour.

In 1935, Buchan's literary work was adapted for the cinema with the release of Alfred Hitchcock's The 39 Steps, starring Robert Donat as Richard Hannay, although Buchan's story was much altered. This came in the same year that Buchan was honoured with appointment to the Order of St Michael and St George on 23 May, as well as being elevated to the peerage, when he was ennobled by King George V as Baron Tweedsmuir, of Elsfield in the County of Oxford on 1 June. This had been done in preparation for Buchan's appointment as Canada's governor general; when consulted by Canadian prime minister R. B. Bennett about the appointment, the Leader of His Majesty's Loyal Opposition, William Lyon Mackenzie King, recommended that the King allow Buchan to serve as viceroy as a commoner, but George V insisted that he be represented by a peer.

Buchan's name had been earlier put forward by Mackenzie King to George V as a candidate for the governor generalcy: Buchan and his wife had been guests of Mackenzie King's at his estate, Kingsmere, in 1924 and Mackenzie King, who at that time was prime minister, was impressed with Buchan, stating, "I know no man I would rather have as a friend, a beautiful, noble soul, kindly & generous in thought & word & act, informed as few men in this world have ever been, modest, humble, true, man after God's own heart." One evening in the following year, the Prime Minister mentioned to Governor General the Lord Byng of Vimy that Buchan would be a suitable successor to Byng, with which the Governor General agreed, the two being friends. Word of this reached the British Cabinet, and Buchan was approached, but he was reluctant to take the posting; Byng had been writing to Buchan about the constitutional dispute that took place in June 1926 and spoke disparagingly of Mackenzie King.

Governor General of Canada

On 27 March 1935, Sir George Halsey Perley announced in the Canadian Parliament (in place of the ailing Bennett, who had recommended Buchan for the governor generalship) that the King "has been graciously pleased to approve the appointment of Mr. John Buchan" as the viceregal representative. The King approved the appointment, made by commission under the royal sign-manual and signet. Buchan then departed for Canada and was sworn in as the country's governor general in a ceremony on 2 November 1935 in the salon rouge of the parliament buildings of Quebec.

By the time Buchan arrived in Canada, William Lyon Mackenzie King had been sworn in as Prime Minister after the Liberal Party won the federal election held the previous month. Buchan was the first viceroy of Canada appointed since the enactment of the Statute of Westminster on 11 December 1931, and was thus the first to have been decided on solely by the monarch of Canada in his Canadian council.

Buchan brought to the post a longstanding knowledge of Canada. He had written many appreciative words about the country as a journalist on The Spectator and had followed the actions of the Canadian forces in the First World War when writing his Nelson History of the War, helped by talks with Julian Byng, before first visiting Canada in 1924. His knowledge and interest in increasing public awareness and accessibility to Canada's past resulted in Buchan being made the Champlain Society's second honorary president between 1938 and 1939. Buchan continued writing during his time as governor general, but he also took his position as viceroy seriously, and from the outset made it his goal to travel the length and breadth of Canada, including to the Arctic regions, to promote Canadian unity. He said of his job: "a Governor General is in a unique position for it is his duty to know the whole of Canada and all the various types of her people."

Buchan also encouraged a distinct Canadian identity and national unity, despite the ongoing Great Depression and the difficulty it caused for the population. Not all Canadians shared Buchan's views; he aroused the ire of imperialists when he said in Montreal in 1937: "a Canadian's first loyalty is not to the British Commonwealth of Nations, but to Canada and Canada's King," a statement that the Montreal Gazette dubbed as "disloyal." Buchan maintained and recited his idea that ethnic groups "should retain their individuality and each make its contribution to the national character" and "the strongest nations are those that are made up of different racial elements."

George V died in late January 1936, and his eldest son, the popular Prince Edward, succeeded to the throne as Edward VIII. Rideau Hall—the royal and viceroyal residence in Ottawa—was decked in black crepe and all formal entertaining was cancelled during the official period of mourning. As the year unfolded, it became evident that the new king planned to marry American divorcée Wallis Simpson, which caused much discontent throughout the Dominions. Buchan conveyed to Buckingham Palace and British Prime Minister Stanley Baldwin Canadians' deep affection for the King, but also the outrage to Canadian religious feelings, both Catholic and Protestant, that would occur if Edward married Simpson. By 11 December, King Edward had abdicated in favour of his younger brother, Prince Albert, Duke of York, who was thereafter known as George VI. In order for the line of succession for Canada to remain parallel to those of the other Dominions, Buchan, as Governor-in-Council, gave the government's consent to the British legislation formalising the abdication, and ratified this with finality when he granted Royal Assent to the Canadian Succession to the Throne Act in 1937. Upon receiving news from Mackenzie King of Edward's decision to abdicate, Tweedsmuir commented that, in his year in Canada as governor general, he had represented three kings.

In May and June 1939, King George VI and Queen Elizabeth toured Canada from coast to coast and paid a state visit to the United States. Buchan had conceived the royal tour before the coronation in 1937; according to the official event historian, Gustave Lanctot, the idea "probably grew out of the knowledge that at his coming Coronation, George VI was to assume the additional title of King of Canada," and Buchan desired to demonstrate vividly Canada's status as an independent kingdom by allowing Canadians to see "their King performing royal functions, supported by his Canadian ministers." Buchan put great effort into securing a positive response from the King to the invitation in May 1937; after more than a year without a reply, in June 1938 Buchan headed to the United Kingdom for a personal holiday, but also to procure a decision on the possible royal tour. From his home near Oxford, Buchan wrote to Mackenzie King: "The important question for me is, of course, the King's visit to Canada." After a period of convalescence at Ruthin Castle, Buchan sailed back to Canada in October with a secured commitment that the royal couple would tour the country. Though he had been a significant contributor to the organisation of the trip, Buchan retired to Rideau Hall for the duration of the royal tour; he expressed the view that while the King of Canada was present, "I cease to exist as Viceroy, and retain only a shadowy legal existence as Governor-General in Council." In Canada itself, the royal couple took part in public events such as the opening of the Lions Gate Bridge in May 1939. The King appointed Tweedsmuir a Knight Grand Cross of the Royal Victorian Order while on the royal train, between Truro and Bedford, Nova Scotia.

Another factor behind the tour was public relations: the presence of the royal couple in Canada and the United States was calculated to shore up sympathy for Britain in anticipation of hostilities with Nazi Germany. Buchan's experiences during the First World War made him averse to conflict, and he tried to help prevent another war in coordination with Mackenzie King and U.S. President Franklin D. Roosevelt. Still, Buchan authorised Canada's declaration of war against Germany in September, shortly after the British declaration of war and with the consent of King George, and thereafter issued orders of deployment for Canadian soldiers, sailors, and airmen as the titular commander-in-chief of the Canadian armed forces.

On 6 February 1940, he slipped and struck his head on the edge of a bath, suffering a severe head injury after suffering a stroke at Rideau Hall. Two surgeries by Doctor Wilder Penfield of the Montreal Neurological Institute were insufficient to save him, and his death on 11 February drew a radio eulogy by Mackenzie King: "In the passing of His Excellency, the people of Canada have lost one of the greatest and most revered of their Governors General, and a friend who, from the day of his arrival in this country, dedicated his life to their service." The Governor General had formed a strong bond with his prime minister, even if it may have been built more on political admiration than friendship: Mackenzie King appreciated Buchan's "sterling rectitude and disinterested purpose."

After lying in state in the Senate chamber on Parliament Hill, Buchan was given a state funeral at St Andrew's Presbyterian Church in Ottawa. His ashes were returned to the UK aboard the cruiser HMS Orion for final burial at Elsfield, the village where he lived in Oxfordshire.

Legacy
In his last years, Buchan wrote his autobiography Memory Hold-the-Door, as well as works on the history of Canada. He and Lady Tweedsmuir established the first proper library at Rideau Hall, and he founded the Governor General's Literary Awards, which remain Canada's premier award for literature. His grandchildren James and Perdita Buchan also became writers.

Buchan's 100 works include nearly 30 novels, seven collections of short stories, and biographies of Sir Walter Scott, Caesar Augustus, and Oliver Cromwell. He was awarded the 1928 James Tait Black Memorial Prize for his biography of the Marquess of Montrose, but the most famous of his books were the spy thrillers, and it is for these that he is now best remembered. The "last Buchan" (as Graham Greene entitled his appreciative review) was the 1941 novel Sick Heart River (American title: Mountain Meadow), in which a dying protagonist confronts the questions of the meaning of life in the Canadian wilderness.

Tweedsmuir Provincial Park in British Columbia is now divided into Tweedsmuir South Provincial Park and Tweedsmuir North Provincial Park and Protected Area. It was created in 1938 to commemorate Buchan's 1937 visit to the Rainbow Range and other nearby areas by horseback and floatplane. He wrote in the foreword to a booklet published to commemorate his visit: "I have now travelled over most of Canada and have seen many wonderful things, but I have seen nothing more beautiful and more wonderful than the great park which British Columbia has done me the honour to call by my name".

His granddaughter Ursula wrote a biography of him, Beyond the Thirty-Nine Steps: A Life of John Buchan  (2019).

In the 21st century, his writing has come under scrutiny for its attitudes towards race. For instance, Roger Kimball states: "One cannot read far into the commentary on Buchan, ... before encountering some stiff criticism of some of his attitudes and language. The criticism resolves into three main charges: Buchan was a colonialist, ... Buchan was a racist ... Buchan was an anti-Semite:..."  while an article in the Herald on Buchan's poem 'The Semitic Spirit speaks' concludes that it "is poisoned by prejudice".

Honours

Appointments
  1 January 1932: Companion of the Order of the Companions of Honour (CH)
  23 May 1935: Knight Grand Cross of the Most Distinguished Order of Saint Michael and Saint George (GCMG)
  2 November 1935: Chief Scout for Canada
  2 November 1935: Honorary Member of the Royal Military College of Canada Club
  28 May 1937: Member of His Majesty's Most Honourable Privy Council (PC)
  15 June 1939: Knight Grand Cross of the Royal Victorian Order (GCVO)
 : Honorary Fellow of Oxford University

Medals
  1935: King George V Silver Jubilee Medal
  1937: King George VI Coronation Medal

Awards
  1897: Stanhope essay prize
  1898: Newdigate Prize
  1928: James Tait Black Memorial Prize
  4 December 1940: Silver Wolf Award (posthumous)

Foreign honours
  15 December 1918: Knight of the Order of the Crown of Italy

Non-national honours
  1937: Master of the Order of Good Cheer

Honorary military appointments 
  2 November 1935: Colonel of the Governor General's Horse Guards
  2 November 1935: Colonel of the Governor General's Foot Guards
  2 November 1935: Colonel of the Canadian Grenadier Guards

Honorary degrees 

  20 June 1934: University of Oxford, Doctor of Civil Law (DCL)
  1936: University of Toronto, Doctor of Laws (LLD)
  1936: University of Toronto, Doctor of Divinity (DD)
  1937: Harvard University, Doctor of Laws (LLD)
  1937: Yale University, Doctor of Laws (LLD)
 : McGill University, Doctor of Laws (LLD)
 : Université de Montréal, Doctor of Laws (LLD)
 : University of Glasgow, Doctor of Laws (LLD)
 : University of St Andrews, Doctor of Laws (LLD)

Honorific eponyms 
Geographic locations
 : Tweedsmuir South Provincial Park
 : Tweedsmuir North Provincial Park and Protected Area
 : Tweedsmuir Peak
 : Tweedsmuir Avenue, Ottawa
 : Tweedsmuir Avenue, Toronto
 : Tweedsmuir Avenue, London
 : Tweedsmuir Place, Deep River
 : Tweedsmuir Place, Pinawa
 : Tweedsmuir Road, Winnipeg
 : Buchan Street, Montreal
 : Tweedsmuir
 : John Buchan Way, Broughton

Schools
 : Strathcona-Tweedsmuir School, Okotoks
 : Lord Tweedsmuir Elementary School, New Westminster
 : Lord Tweedsmuir Secondary School, Surrey
 : Tweedsmuir Hall (student residence), University of British Columbia
 : John Buchan Senior Public School, Toronto
 : Tweedsmuir Public School, North Bay
 : Tweedsmuir Public School, London

Organisations
 : John Buchan Centre, Broughton

See also
 List of works by John Buchan
 List of Scottish novelists
 List of European mystery writers

References

Further reading
 Bell, John. "John Buchan: Adventurer on the Borderland". (Introduction to) John Buchan, The Far Islands and Other Tales of Fantasy. West Kingston, RI: Donald M. Grant, 1984, pp7–18
 Brinckman, John, Down North: John Buchan and Margaret-Bourke on the Mackenzie 
 Buchan, Ursula. Beyond the Thirty-Nine Steps: A Life of John Buchan (Bloomsbury, 2019) 
 Daniell, David, The Interpreter's House: A Critical Assessment of John Buchan (Nelson, 1975) 
 Galbraith, J. William, "John Buchan: Model Governor General" (Dundurn, Toronto, 2013) 
 Lownie, Andrew, John Buchan: The Presbyterian Cavalier (David R. Godine Publisher, 2003) 
 Macdonald, Kate, John Buchan: A Companion to the Mystery Fiction (McFarland & Company, 2009) 
 Macdonald, Kate (ed.), Reassessing John Buchan: Beyond 'The Thirty-Nine Steps''' (Pickering & Chatto, 2009) 
 Smith, Janet Adam, John Buchan: A Biography (1965) (Oxford University Press, reissue 1985) 
 Waddell, Nathan, Modern John Buchan: A Critical Introduction'' (Cambridge Scholars Publishing, 2009)

External links

 Queen's University Library, Ottawa, Canada, Checklist of Works by and About John Buchan, Boston: G. K. Hall, 1961
 Buchan, John, A History of the Great War, Vol. I, Boston: Houghton Mifflin, 1922
 Buchan, John, A History of the Great War, Vol. II, Boston: Houghton Mifflin, 1922
 Buchan, John, A History of the Great War, Vol. III, Boston: Houghton Mifflin, 1922
 Buchan, John, A History of the Great War, Vol. IV, Boston: Houghton Mifflin, 1922
 
 
 
 Project Gutenberg Australia: Works by John Buchan
  Please sign up for free to view original documents
 
 
 
 Governor General of Canada: Lord Tweedsmuir
 The Canadian Encyclopedia: John Buchan, 1st Baron Tweedsmuir
 The John Buchan Society
 John Buchan Museum
 
 
 
 John Buchan Letters at Dartmouth College Library

 
1875 births
1940 deaths
Tweedsmuir, John Buchan, 1st Baron
Unionist Party (Scotland) MPs
Members of the Parliament of the United Kingdom for the Combined Scottish Universities
Chancellors of the University of Edinburgh
Scottish historical novelists
Scottish biographers
Scottish novelists
Scottish Presbyterians
Scottish nationalists
Scottish soldiers
Scottish thriller writers
Writers of historical fiction set in the early modern period
British Army personnel of World War I
Intelligence Corps officers
Presidents of the Oxford Union
Alumni of Brasenose College, Oxford
People from Kirkcaldy
Writers from Perth, Scotland
Elders of the Church of Scotland
Ordained peers
Lords High Commissioner to the General Assembly of the Church of Scotland
Tweedsmuir, John Buchan, 1st Baron
Tweedsmuir, John Buchan, 1st Baron
Members of the Order of the Companions of Honour
Knights Grand Cross of the Order of St Michael and St George
Knights Grand Cross of the Royal Victorian Order
Deputy Lieutenants of Oxfordshire
Alumni of the University of Glasgow
UK MPs 1924–1929
UK MPs 1929–1931
UK MPs 1931–1935
UK MPs who were granted peerages
People associated with the Scottish Borders
Recipients of the Order of the Crown (Italy)
People educated at Hutchesons' Grammar School
James Tait Black Memorial Prize recipients
Victorian novelists
19th-century British novelists
20th-century British novelists
Burials in Oxfordshire
Chief Scouts of Canada
20th-century biographers
Persons of National Historic Significance (Canada)
Weird fiction writers
Scottish autobiographers
Barons created by George V